Fudan University is a national public research university in Shanghai, China. Fudan is a member of the C9 League, Project 985, Project 211, and the Double First Class University identified by the Ministry of Education of China. It is also a member of Universitas 21, Washington University's McDonnell International Scholars Academy, and the Association of Pacific Rim Universities, BRICS Universities League, Association of East Asian Research Universities, and Council on Business & Society.

Fudan is a collegiate university with five colleges – Zhide, Tengfei, Keqing, Renzhong, and Xide. It is now composed of four campuses in Shanghai – Handan, Fenglin, Zhangjiang, and Jiangwan – which share the same central administration. Fudan has 17 hospitals affiliated.

As of 2022, Fudan University is ranked 3rd in China, 7th in Asia and 31st globally according to the QS Rankings. Fudan's notable alumni include Chen Yinke, Chen Wangdao, Chu Coching, Yan Fu, Yu Youren and "China's Kissinger" Wang Huning.

History 
Fudan University, then romanized as Fuh Tan, was founded as Fudan Public School in 1905, by Ma Xiangbo, SJ, who had resigned from Aurora University. The two Chinese characters Fu (means "again") and Dan (means "morning", "light" ), meaning both "(heavenly light shines) day after day" and "Aurora Revived", were chosen by Ma on the recommendation of Yu You-jen, from the Confucian Classic Shangshu Dazhuan: "Itinerant as the twilight, sun glows and moon luminesces". The university motto "Scientia et studium, quaestio et cogitatio" comes from Analects Book 19.6, which means "rich in knowledge and tenacious of purposes, inquiring with earnestness and reflecting with self-practice".

In 1911, during the Xinhai Revolution, the college was occupied as headquarters of the Guangfu Army and closed down for almost one year.

In 1917, Fudan Public School became a private university named the Private Fudan University, and also had a middle school and university-preparatory school. In 1929, Fudan reorganized its departments, expanding to include departments of journalism, municipals, law, and education.

After the Japanese invasion of China in 1937, Fudan moved with the Kuomintang government to the inland city of Chongqing, the wartime Chinese capital. On December 25, 1941, the First Meeting of Fifth Conference of the Highest Executive Authority of the National Government of the Republic of China voted to change Fudan University (Chongqing) to a public university with Wu Nanxuan as its president. Fudan University then became National Fudan University. After the end of World War II, it moved back to Shanghai.

1949 - present 
After the founding of the People's Republic of China in 1949, Fudan lost its "National" appellation and became Fudan University to reflect the fact that all universities under the new socialist state would be public. Fudan was the first university to be reorganized by the new government in 1952 and modeled on Soviet education. The original departments were changed, with arts and sciences departments from at least ten other universities in eastern China being added. Parts of Aurora University merged into Fudan in 1952.

In the late 1970s, after the Cultural Revolution, the university was converted to a modern, comprehensive university.

Fudan University and Shanghai Medical University merged in 2000.

Controversies 
In December 2019, Fudan University changed its constitution, removing the phrase "academic independence and freedom of thought" (學術獨立和思想自由) and including a "pledge to follow the Communist party's leadership" (學校堅持中國共產黨的領導), leading to protests among the students. It also said that Fudan University had to "equip its teachers and employees" with "Xi Jinping Thought", leading to concerns about the diminishing academic freedom of Fudan.

The Hungarian government made an agreement to open the first campus of Fudan University outside China in Budapest in 2024. The expansion would cost 540 billion HUF, of which 450 billion would be paid by the Hungarian state from a Chinese loan. The construction would be mainly done by Chinese companies. Education professionals and politicians denounced the investment, citing economics, higher education and national security concerns.

Institutions

Organizations
Fudan University comprises 17 full-time schools, 69 departments, 73 bachelor's degree programs, 22 disciplines and 134 sub-disciplines authorized to confer PhD degrees, 201 master's degree programs, 6 professional degree programs, 7 key social science research centers of Ministry of Education P.R.C, 9 national basic science research and training institutes and 25 post-doctoral research stations. It has 40 national key disciplines granted by the Ministry of Education, nationally third. At present, it has 77 research institutes, 112 cross-disciplinary research institutes, and 5 national key laboratories. See a list of schools and departments at Fudan.

Fudan University enrolls over 45,000, including full-time students and students in continuing education and online education. Additionally, there are approximately 7,000 international students, ranking sixth nationally.

Fudan University has a high-level research faculty of over 2,600 full-time teachers and researchers, including 1,350 professors and associate professors, 47 academicians of the Chinese Academy of Sciences and the Chinese Academy of Engineering, nearly 660 doctoral supervisors, 26 special professors and 2 lecture professors of "Cheungkong Scholars Program", 3 distinguished professors and 10 special professors of Fudan University, 6 principal scientists of Project 973 and 25 "Young Experts with Prominent Contributions to the Country".

Fudan University has 17 affiliated hospitals, such as Zhongshan Hospital and Huashan Hospital, integrating medical service, medicine education, and research.

Fudan University has an "International Student's Dormitory", a building reserved as living quarters for any students from countries other than China studying either degree or non-degree programs. Notable alumni include Jennifer Chu and Audrey Lamsam of Arcadia, California, who started a nonprofit organization called "Food4Me" in 2012. This organization first stemmed from their studies as non-degree Chinese students at the university.

Fudan is a member of Universitas 21, an international consortium of research-driven universities.

The Guanghua Twin Towers at the center of the Handan campus reach 140.5 meters, reportedly the highest buildings ever constructed in a university campus in Asia, and 2nd around the world.

The High School Affiliated to Fudan University, located on the Handan campus, is one of the most prestigious high schools in China.

Library
Fudan University Library was formally established in 1922, previously known as the Reading Room of Wu Wu (1918). Today it comprises the Liberal Arts Library, the Science Library and the Medical Library, with a total floor of 29,000 square meters.

By the end of 2004, the Library's collection was composed of more than 4.4588 million copies and articles, including books, journals, bound volumes of newspapers, and audio-visual recordings. Of all these 400,000 are thread-bound books of Chinese classics (including 7,000 rare copies), 100,000 are books published during the reign of the Republic of China, and 1.392 million are foreign books. Additionally, there are 32,000 Chinese and foreign journals and periodicals. Every year 100,000 new books will be added to enlarge the collection. The library subscribes to around 7,000 printed journals.

The library has access to 24,000 full-text e-journals and over 150 CD and online databases. It has eight open stacks, two general reading rooms and 19 reading rooms with specialized functions, totaling 2,400 seats. The library is open for 112 hours weekly and serves more than 7,000 visiting readers daily.

The Fudan University Library is divided into the China Academic Humanities and Social Sciences Library (CAHSL), the National Foreign Textbook Center for East China (sponsored by the Ministry of Education), the Documentation and Information Center for Liberal Arts, and the Central Stacks for Foreign Books of Liberal Arts. Additionally, the library has the Shanghai Electronic Documents Searching Center for Graduates, the CD Searching Center shared by the universities in Northeast Shanghai, and the General Search Station for Updated Science and Technology Information Authorized by the Ministry of Education, the Search Station for Updated Science and Technology Information Authorized by the Shanghai Science and Technology Committee. The library edits and publishes two journals: China Index and Information Services of the Higher Education Institutions in Shanghai.

The library's integrated computer management system has been upgraded several times. In addition to general services, the Library provides services of international online information retrieval, various types of e-resources searching, interlibrary loans, document delivery service, online consultation, updated information search, user training, tape duplication, multimedia viewing, document duplication, and binding, etc. The courses of literature and information retrieval are designed for Library users of different levels.

Rankings and reputation

General rankings 
Fudan University is consistently ranked among the top universities in Asia according to major international university rankings. The joint THE-QS World University Rankings 2005 ranked Fudan University 3rd in China, 11th in Asia and 72nd in the world. In 2015, the U.S. News & World Report ranked Fudan University 96th in the world, 8th in Asia and 3rd in China. Fudan University graduates are highly desired in China and worldwide. In 2017, its Graduate Employability rankings placed at 14th in the world and 3rd in Asia after (Tsinghua and Peking) in the QS Graduate Employability Rankings. It ranked 3rd in the QS BRICS University Rankings (2019).

As of 2021, the QS World University Rankings 2022 ranked Fudan at 31st in the world and 3rd in China after (Tsinghua and Peking) and it was 6th in the independent regional QS Asian University Rankings (2021). Further, Academic Ranking of World Universities (2022) placed 67th globally. Internationally, Fudan University is regarded as one of the most reputable Chinese universities by the Times Higher Education World Reputation Rankings where it ranked 39th globally.

Fudan University is among the top 100 universities in the world and the top five in China according to some of the most-widely read university rankings in the world such as the Academic Ranking of World Universities, the QS World University Rankings, and the Times Higher Education World University Rankings.

Research Performance and Subjects Rankings 
According to the 2021 QS World University by Subject, Fudan University was ranked among the top 50 in the world in "Social Sciences & Management", "Natural Science" and "Engineering & Technology" subjects, while it falls within the global top 100 in "Arts and Humanities" and "Life Science and Medicines" related fields.

Regarding research output in natural science and life science, the Nature Index Annual Table 2022 ranked Fudan the No.8 university in the Asia Pacific region, and 15th in the world among the global universities. The 2022 CWTS Leiden Ranking ranked Fudan 15th in the world based on their publications for the time period 2017–2020.

Admissions

Popularity and selectivity 
Fudan University's undergraduate program is extremely selective. Fudan is one of the five universities (together with Tsinghua University, Peking University, Zhejiang University and Shanghai Jiao Tong University) in China whose undergraduate programs are the hardest for students to get in: less than 0.2% of National College Entrance Examination ("Gaokao") takers can make it. (As a comparison, the five most selective Ivy League schools in 2012 let in three times the percentage (0.6%) of SAT-takers.) Fudan has been placed consistently among the three most selective universities (with Tsinghua University and Peking University) in China for the last twenty years.

Undergraduate program 
 
Fudan has reconstructed its course system to suit education goals. A course scheme of general education, specialized education and basic education in arts and sciences has been implemented. Encompassing a complete and comprehensive range of disciplines, the courses of general education enable students to receive education in diverse fields. All of the 70-plus undergraduate majors of Fudan have been put into seven general categories so that students can benefit on a broader scale from the systematic discipline training. According to the Education Scheme for Arts and Sciences, course modules are determined by discipline systems and course suits, and credits by course modules. In this sense, Fudan provides students with more options for their college studies. In contrast with the traditional syllabus, the new module has appropriately decreased the gross credits and class hours. Along with minor programs and extracurricular academic activities, it contributes greatly to the intellectual development of undergraduate students, exposing them to a wider range of knowledge.

Graduate program 
The Graduate School of Fudan University was established on 6 November 1984 and the Graduate School of Shanghai Medical University on 25 January 1985. Both were among the first 22 graduate schools after China's universities officially resumed enrolling graduate students. With the merger of Shanghai Medical University and Fudan University in April 2000, the two graduate schools were joined to be a new Graduate School of Fudan University. Therefore, a comprehensive graduate education structure is formed with disciplines in humanities, law, sciences, engineering, medicine, and management.

International students 
Starting from the 1950s, Fudan has enrolled international students – one of the first few institutions in China to do so. Since then, Fudan has accepted and trained over 10,000 foreign students from 100 countries and regions worldwide. The international student programs consist of degree programs and non-degree programs.

Campus

All four campuses are in downtown Shanghai and share the same central administration.

Handan campus
Handan campus, the main campus of Fudan, is located in Yangpu District, Shanghai. It contains the majority of the schools and departments. Freshman undergraduates live on this campus. Handan campus consists of four sub-campuses, namely the headquarters campus, the south campus, the north campus, and the east campus.

Fenglin campus
Fudan University Shanghai Medical College, or Medical Center of Fudan University (former Shanghai Medical University) is at Fenglin campus, located in Xuhui District, Shanghai. In July 2014, the campus began a 2-year large-scale construction project. About 4000 students move out of the old campus for the construction and in July 2017 students came back to it.

Zhangjiang campus
Zhangjiang campus is located in Shanghai's Zhangjiang Hi-Tech Park, Pudong District. It comprises the School of Microelectronics, the School of Computer science and technology, the School of Software, and the School of Pharmacy.

Jiangwan campus
The School of Law has moved to Jiangwan, and other schools will follow, including the School of Life Science, the College of Foreign Language and Literature, and School of Social Development and Public Policy.

Student associations
There are four categories of student associations: Academic Societies, Practical Societies, Artistic Societies, and Physical Culture Societies. See also Student Associations at Fudan.

Notable alumni 

Since 1952, Fudan University has a total of 95 academicians alumni, second only to Peking University and Tsinghua University in China. Fudan's notable alumni include Chen Yinke, Chen Wangdao, Chu Coching, Yan Fu, Yu Youren and "China's Kissinger" Wang Huning.

Partnerships

Fudan is a member of the C9 League, Project 985, Project 211, and the Double First Class University identified by the Ministry of Education of China. It is also a member of Universitas 21, Washington University's McDonnell International Scholars Academy, and the Association of Pacific Rim Universities, BRICS Universities League, Association of East Asian Research Universities, and Council on Business & Society.

Fudan University is a member of the Consortium of Academic Stewards for The Scholar Ship. The university is also a member of China Center Austria and partner of the Austrian Business School SMBS.

In February 2008, Fudan University launched the Fudan University Education Development Foundation in New York. 

In 1995, Fudan established the Nordic Centre in Shanghai, a joint platform for research and education with 14 universities from Denmark, Finland, Norway, and Sweden. By 2012, the Nordic Centre Fudan has 27 member institutions in 5 Nordic countries.

In 1996, Fudan School of Management started a joint Master of Management (later MBA) program with BI Norwegian Business School. The program, inaugurated by then Norwegian Prime Minister Gro Harlem Brundtland, is the longest continually operating international business school partnership in China.

In 2002, a joint venture was created between the Olin Business School (Washington University in St. Louis) and the School of Management at Fudan University. At the time, it was one of the first U.S.-Sino joint MBA programs in China. Eight years later, according to The Financial Times' 2010 rankings, the Washington University-Fudan University EMBA Program was ranked as one of the top 20 international executive MBA programs worldwide. Also, in 2015, for the fifth consecutive year, it was hailed as the best program in the country.

In 2011, Fudan became part of the Tyndall Centre network, a research network centered on climate science and climate policy research. Fudan Tyndall Centre is funded with a 15-year commitment by the Chinese central government and the Shanghai City government. The UK launch of the Fudan Tyndall Centre alliance took place in Norwich in May 2011 when Professor Academician Yuliang Yang was awarded an honorary degree by the University of East Anglia

In Germany, the Fudan University cooperates with the Goethe-University in Frankfurt/Main. Both cities are linked by a long-lasting partnership agreement. The university also established partnerships with the Freie Universität Berlin, the University of Cologne, the University of Tübingen, the Hertie School and the University of Konstanz.

Exchange programs
Fudan University has established exchange relationships with more than 200 universities and research institutions in about 30 countries and regions, including all 10 campuses of the University of California, Harvard University, Yale University, University of Chicago, Columbia University, University of Rochester, Georgetown University, Oklahoma State University, Beloit College, Washington University in St. Louis, University of Toronto, Mount Allison University, University of British Columbia, University of Montreal, Queen's University, York University, University of Sydney, LUISS Guido Carli University, University of Adelaide, Rhodes University, K.U. Leuven, Bocconi University, Istituto Universitario Orientale di Napoli, Tokyo University, National University of Singapore, University of Salzburg, the University of Manchester, Durham University Business School, University of Edinburgh, the London School of Economics, King's College London, University of Mannheim, ESSEC Business School, University of Paris 1 Pantheon-Sorbonne, Hertie School, Sciences Po Paris and Sciences Po Lille, IE Business School, Trinity College Dublin, University College Dublin and the University of North Carolina and State University of New York systems.

See also 
 Auto-ID Labs
 S3 Asia MBA – Joint MBA program by Fudan University, Korea University and NUS Business School

References

External links

 
 3D map
 International Metropolis

 
1905 establishments in China
Educational institutions established in 1905
Universities and colleges in Shanghai
Universities in China with English-medium medical schools
Vice-ministerial universities in China
Project 211
Project 985
Plan 111
C9 League
Xuhui District